Benjamin Mecz (24 August 1985 – 17 December 2017) was an artist who worked between Paris and Tel Aviv. Ben’s practice evolved around the activation of both the viewer and the space. He worked with a sense of urgency and took many initiatives while he was an MFA student at Bezalel Academy of Arts and Design Bezalel Academy: he set up a project space (Eti Levi), organized a students trip to Dusseldorf and more. He had a true passion for art and for people and he had the talent to harness it in his work.

Exhibitions

Solo shows

2011
 RE-CREATIV COMMUNITY, Galerie Bernard Ceysson Paris, France

2013
 TAILLE UNIQUE, Galerie Bernard Ceysson Saint Etienne, France

Group shows

2009
 The Brick Lane Zoo, Brick Lane Gallery, Londres, Royaume-Uni 

2012
 Supervues, Petite surface de l'art contemporain, Hôtel Burrhus, Vaison - la - Romaine, France

2013
 In Media Res, Galerie Georges Verney-Caron, commissariat : Alexis Jakubowicz, en résonance à la XIIe Biennale de Lyon, France

2015
 KNULP, YIA ART FAIR #05, Bibliothèque Historique de la Ville de Paris (BHVP), Paris, France

Sources

 Site officiel

 Exposition Re-Creativ Community (2011)

 Exposition Taille Unique (2013)

 flamme trop vite eteinte de Benjamin mecz

 La tente pièce de l'exposition Taille Unique (2013) 

 Art Media Agency (AMA) 

 www.carnetdart.com: hommage  

 Souncloud.com: hommage 

 Décés de l'artiste juif Benjamin Mecz

 Mourir au soleil 

 Exposition Taille unique 

http://www.shiny-people.com/portfolio/l-art-et-la-matiere/

1985 births
2017 deaths
French artists